Eidelberg is a surname. Notable people with the surname include: 

 Joseph Eidelberg, Israeli historian
 Martin Eidelberg, American art historian
 Paul Eidelberg, American-Israeli political scientist and author

See also 
 Eidelberger
 Edelmann (Edelman)

Jewish surnames
Germanic-language surnames
Yiddish-language surnames